Nottingham is a town in Rockingham County, New Hampshire, United States. The population was 5,229 at the 2020 census, up from 4,785 at the 2010 census. It is the location of Pawtuckaway State Park.

History 

Incorporated in 1722 by Lieutenant Governor John Wentworth, Nottingham was named for Daniel Finch, 2nd Earl of Nottingham. The earl was a close friend of Samuel Shute and Joseph Dudley, previous colonial governors of New Hampshire. Among the grantees was Peregrine White, descendant of Peregrine White of the Mayflower, the first child of English parentage born in New England. At one time, the town had 17 watermills in operation.

The town was site of a massacre in September 1747, when Elizabeth Simpson, Robert Beard and Nathaniel Folsom were slain by Indians of the Winnipesaukee tribe.

Nottingham once included Deerfield, incorporated in 1766, and Northwood, in 1773.

Four Revolutionary War generals were from Nottingham: Joseph Cilley, Henry Dearborn, Henry Butler, and Thomas Bartlett.

Nottingham has the oldest continually operating municipal recycling center in the country, and it was the first town in the nation to make recycling mandatory. The recycling center began operation in January 1974.

Geography

Containing 14 lakes and ponds, Nottingham is drained by the Pawtuckaway, North, and Little rivers, all tributaries of the Lamprey River, which passes south and east of the town and flows into Great Bay at Newmarket. The circular-shaped Pawtuckaway Mountains are a prime example of what geologists term a ring dike complex.

Named communities in the town include Nottingham village, Nottingham Square, North Nottingham, and West Nottingham.

Adjacent municipalities
 Barrington, New Hampshire (northeast)
 Lee, New Hampshire (east)
 Epping, New Hampshire (southeast)
 Raymond, New Hampshire (southwest)
 Deerfield, New Hampshire (west)
 Northwood, New Hampshire (northwest)

Demographics

As of the census of 2000, there were 3,701 people, 1,331 households, and 1,048 families residing in the town.  The population density was 79.6 people per square mile (30.8/km).  There were 1,592 housing units at an average density of 34.3 per square mile (13.2/km).  The racial makeup of the town was 98.38% White, 0.19% African American, 0.19% Native American, 0.57% Asian, 0.03% Pacific Islander, 0.27% from other races, and 0.38% from two or more races. Hispanic or Latino of any race were 0.70% of the population.

There were 1,331 households, out of which 40.3% had children under the age of 18 living with them, 68.9% were married couples living together, 6.1% had a female householder with no husband present, and 21.2% were non-families. 15.0% of all households were made up of individuals, and 3.5% had someone living alone who was 65 years of age or older.  The average household size was 2.78 and the average family size was 3.09.

In the town, the population was spread out, with 27.8% under the age of 18, 4.3% from 18 to 24, 33.7% from 25 to 44, 27.0% from 45 to 64, and 7.2% who were 65 years of age or older.  The median age was 38 years. For every 100 females, there were 102.9 males.  For every 100 females age 18 and over, there were 101.7 males.

The median income for a household in the town was $62,423, and the median income for a family was $65,510. Males had a median income of $41,182 versus $29,738 for females. The per capita income for the town was $24,879.  About 0.9% of families and 2.5% of the population were below the poverty line, including 1.2% of those under age 18 and 2.3% of those age 65 or over.

Education

The town of Nottingham provides kindergarten through 8th grade education at Nottingham Elementary School.  The town pays tuition to Dover High School for its high school-aged students, and also has an agreement with Coe-Brown Northwood Academy in neighboring Northwood.

Notable people 

 Bradbury Cilley (1760–1831), U.S. congressman
 Jonathan Cilley (1802–1838), U.S. congressman, died in a duel with another congressman, William J. Graves of Kentucky
 Joseph Cilley (1734–1799), state senator, Revolutionary War general
 Joseph Cilley (1791–1887), U.S. senator from New Hampshire
 Henry Dearborn (1751–1829), U.S. congressman from Massachusetts and Revolutionary War general
 James Patrick Kelly (born 1951), science fiction author
 Else Holmelund Minarik (1920–2012), author of children's books

Sites of interest

 Pawtuckaway State Park
 Square Schoolhouse – historic schoolhouse, now a museum. It is one of the best-preserved mid-19th century schoolhouses in southern New Hampshire.
 Dame School – historic meeting house, school, and now local historical museum

References

External links
 
 New Hampshire Economic and Labor Market Information Bureau Profile
 Nottingham Historical Society

Nottingham, New Hampshire
Towns in Rockingham County, New Hampshire
Populated places established in 1722
Towns in New Hampshire
Recycling in the United States